Calcot Mill is an historic former watermill on the Holy Brook, a channel of the River Kennet in the English county of Berkshire. The mill is situated in the civil parish of Holybrook and to the south of Calcot, a suburb of Reading.

The original mill belonged to Reading Abbey, whose monks are believed to have created the Holy Brook as a water supply to this and other mills owned by them.

Between 1876 and 1928 the GWR operated a siding serving the mill which was shunted by a horse.

In 1966, the mill, then owned by Calcot Flour Mills, was badly damaged by fire. Since then the building has been converted to apartments.

See also 
List of watermills in the United Kingdom

References 

Buildings and structures in Berkshire
Watermills in Berkshire